Nagari is a town in Chittoor district of the Indian state of Andhra Pradesh. It is the mandal headquarters of Nagari mandal in Nagari revenue division.

Geography
It has an average elevation of 116 metres (380 feet).

Weather

Demographics
 Census of India, the town had a population of 96,152. The total population constitute, 48,058 males and 48,094 females —a sex ratio of 1000 females per 1000 males, higher than the national average of 940 per 1000. 10,518 children are in the age group of 0–6 years, of which 5,471 are boys and 5,047 are girls—a ratio of 922 per 1000. The average literacy rate stands at 65.14% with 62,640 literates, lower than the national average of 73.00%.

Education
The primary and secondary school education is imparted by government, aided and private schools, under the School Education Department of the state.

References

Towns in Chittoor district